Hydrophonic is the first studio album by the San Francisco, CA based band New Monsoon.

Track listing
 On The Sun
 Drivewheel
 Before I Begin
 African Rain
 Country Interlude
 Lucky Hour
 Wagon Train
 Cypress
 Mean Poem
 Vickassippi
 Transgression

Personnel
New Monsoon:
Brian Carey - percussion, conga, timbales
Heath Carlisle - bass, guitar, vocals, cover art
Phil Ferlino - organ, piano, keyboards
Rajiv Parikh - percussion, tabla, vocals
Bo Carper - acoustic guitar, banjo, dobro
Jeff Miller - guitar (electric), vocals (background)
Marty Ylitalo - drums, didjeridu

External links
New Monsoon
Jeff Miller

2001 debut albums
New Monsoon albums